Mallepuvu is a 2008 Indian Telugu-language film directed by V. Samudra. The film has Bhumika and Murali Krishna who debuts in the lead role, supported by Suman Setty, RK, Sukumar, and Kovai Sarala. The film was launched on 30 April 2008.

Cast
 Murali Krishna as Koti
 Bhumika Chawla as Malligadu
 Suman Setty
 RK
 Sukumar
 Sameer
 Hemasundar
 Tilak
 Venu Madhav
 Kovai Sarala
 Abhinayashree as Rathãlu
 Geetha Singh
 Telangana Shakuntala
 Farjana

Soundtrack
Ilayaraja's musical Mallepuvvu was launched at a grand function organized in Taj Deccan, Hyderabad on the night of 4 August. Maestro has come up with 8 melodies in just one hour and shocked everyone. He said the story has inspired him very much to come out with tunes so fast. He even bought the Tamil rights of the movie while Bhumika bought the Hindi remake rights. Bhumika Chawla is doing the title role and Murali Krishna as Koti.

The album has 9 tracks.
 Malle Puvvulo - Shreya Ghoshal, Karthik
 Lokam - Tippu
 Gajula - Manjari
 Suvvu Suvvi - Bhavatharini
 Chandamama - Shreya Ghoshal, Ilaiyaraaja
 Chirugaali - Vijay Yesudas
 Hero Nenochane - Tippu
 Vasthaavaa Naatho - Malathi
 Theme Music - Ilaiyaraaja

References

External links
 

2000s Telugu-language films
2008 films
Cross-dressing in Indian films
Films scored by Ilaiyaraaja
Films directed by V. Samudra